1895 in Argentine football saw Lomas retaining a new edition of the league championship to become the first team to win the Primera División title 3 times in a row. The runner-up was its related team Lomas Academy. This was the last tournament played by Buenos Aires and Rosario Railway before merging with Belgrano Athletic Club.

Primera división

Final standings

1 It was registered as the football team of the School. The English High School A.C. (named "Alumni" since 1900) would be established in 1898.

References

 
Seasons in Argentine football
Argentine
1895 in South American football